Hisense Kelon or  simply Kelon, formerly Guangdong Kelon Electrical Holdings Company Limited, is one of the largest Chinese white goods manufacturers, producing refrigerators, air conditioners, freezers and small electric appliances. The company is well known in mainland China under its brand names Kelon and Ronshen. The head office of the company is in Shunde, Foshan, Guangdong.

History
Founded in 1984 in Shunde, an industrial county in Guangdong, Kelon started to produce refrigerators. Its H shares were listed on the Hong Kong Stock Exchange in 1996 while A shares were listed on the Shenzhen Stock Exchange in 1999. In 2006, Hisense Group, another large-scale white goods manufacturer in Qingdao, Shandong, acquired Kelon and became Kelon's largest shareholder. In 2007, the company name was changed to Hisense Kelon Electrical Holdings Limited after the acquisition.

In 2018 October, Kelon has proposed changes to the Chinese and English names of the company. The name is proposed to change from "Hisense Kelon Electrical Holdings Company Limited" to "Hisense Home Appliances Group Co., Ltd."

H shares trading suspended 2005–2009
On June 16, 2005, Kelon announced that trading in its H shares was suspended "pending the release of an announcement in relation to price sensitive information". This was because Kelon's former chairman and largest shareholder, Gu Chujun, was involved in seizing company assets and was being investigated by the Foshan police. Gu was later dismissed by Kelon's board. The case was settled by the Intermediate People's Court of Foshan City on 9 January 2009. H shares resumed trading on 21 January 2009.

References

External links
Hisense Kelon
Hisense Smart TV
AC & Heating Company

Hisense
Companies listed on the Shenzhen Stock Exchange
Companies listed on the Hong Kong Stock Exchange
Privately held companies of China
Companies established in 1984
H shares
Home appliance brands
Heating, ventilation, and air conditioning companies
Shunde District
Companies based in Foshan
Chinese brands